Canadian Ultimate Championships (CUC) is an annual Ultimate Frisbee tournament organised by Ultimate Canada and the player association of the city where the championships are held. Until 2016, all divisions were hosted in the same location.  Beginning in 2016 the mixed divisions have been held as a separate event.

History of ultimate and disc sports in Canada

Organized disc sports began in the early 1970s, with promotional efforts from Irwin Toy, the Canadian Open Frisbee Championships, Toronto (1972–85), the Vancouver Open Frisbee Championships (1974–77) and professionals using Frisbee show tours to perform at universities, fairs and sporting events. Disc sports such as freestyle, double disc court, guts, ultimate and disc golf became this sports first events. Two sports, the team sport of  ultimate and disc golf are very popular worldwide and are now being played semi-professionally. The World Flying Disc Federation, Professional Disc Golf Association, Freestyle Players Association are the official rules and sanctioning organizations for flying disc sports worldwide. Ultimate Canada is the official rules and sanctioning organization for ultimate in Canada.

Ultimate is a team sport played with a flying disc. The object of the game is to score points by passing the disc to members of your own team, on a rectangular field, 120 yards (110m) by 40 yards (37m), until you have successfully completed a pass to a team member in the opposing team's end zone. In the early 1970s, Ken Westerfield introduced ultimate along with other disc sports North of the 49th parallel at the Canadian Open Frisbee Championships, Toronto (1972-1985) and the Vancouver Open Frisbee Championships (1974–1977). In 1979, Ken Westerfield and Chris Lowcock, created the Toronto Ultimate Club (TUC). The Toronto Ultimate Club is one of the ultimate's oldest leagues.

The first Canadian Ultimate Championships (CUC) were held for the open division in Ottawa in 1987, produced by Marcus Brady and Brian Guthrie. OCUA subsequently hosted the 1993, 1999, 2002, 2011 and 2017 Canadian Ultimate Championships.

Canada has been ranked number one in the Ultimate World Rankings several times since 1998 in all the Ultimate Divisions (including Open and Women's) according to the World Flying Disc Federation.

In 2013, as a founding partner, the Toronto Ultimate Club presented Canada's first semi-professional ultimate team, the Toronto Rush to the American Ultimate Disc League (AUDL). In their first season they went undefeated 18-0 and won the AUDL championships. The American Ultimate Disc League and the now defunct Major League Ultimate (MLU) are the first semi-professional ultimate leagues.

Upcoming Championships
The 33rd championships, CUC 2019, will be held in Edmonton, Alberta, August 11–18, 2019.
 
CUC 2019 Mixed will take place in Brampton, Ontario, August 22–25, 2019.

Past Championships

Locations

Open

Women

Mixed

Junior Open

Junior Girls

Junior Mixed

Masters Open

Masters Women

Masters Mixed

Notes

External links
 Ultimate Canada
 Ottawa Carleton Ultimate Association (OCUA) 
 Toronto Ultimate Club (TUC) 
 Victoria Ultimate Players Society (VUPS) 
 Vancouver Ultimate League (VUL) 
 Ottawa and Toronto Competitive History 
 Association d'Ultimate de Sherbrooke
 Manitoba Organization of Disc Sports
 Calgary Ultimate Association
 Edmonton Ultimate Players Association
 Halifax Ultimate Recreational League
 Montreal Ultimate Association
 History of Frisbee and Disc Sports

Sports competitions in Canada
Ultimate (sport) competitions